John Turner (c.1734–1817) was an English churchman, Archdeacon of Taunton from 19 September 1780 until his death on  28 March 1817. He matriculated at Hertford College, Oxford in 1751, aged 17, graduating B.A. in 1755.

Notes

18th-century English Anglican priests
Archdeacons of Taunton
1817 deaths
Alumni of Hertford College, Oxford
Year of birth uncertain